Hoju is a family register system in North Korea and formerly in South Korea. Hoju means the "head of the family" or "head of the household", Hojuje is the "head of the family" system, and Hojeok is the "family register". In South Korea, it was formally introduced in 1953.

Analogous to other family registries across East Asia, it is similar to the Chinese hukou and the Japanese koseki. 

Opponents of the hoju system believed it to be innately patriarchal and representing a "violation of the right to gender equality". In South Korea, it was opposed by both feminists and by representatives of other religious traditions including Buddhism and Christianity. South Korea abolished hoju on 1 January 2008 after the Constitutional Court found it incompatible with the constitution in 2005.

References 

East Asian Family registers
Law of South Korea

zh:戶